Ralph Holden (born 1890) was an English footballer who played as a midfielder.

External links
 LFC History profile

1890 births
English footballers
St Helens Recreation F.C. players
Liverpool F.C. players
Tranmere Rovers F.C. players
Year of death missing
Association football midfielders